Margaret Seltzer (pseudonymously Margaret B. Jones, born 1975) is an American writer. 

In 2008, Seltzer published her first book, Love and Consequences: A Memoir of Hope and Survival, about her alleged experiences growing up as a half white, half Native American foster child and Bloods gang member in South Central Los Angeles. Shortly after publication, the book was proven to be completely fictitious: Seltzer was actually fully white, grew up with her biological parents in the upscale San Fernando Valley community of Sherman Oaks and attended Campbell Hall, an affluent Episcopalian day school in the North Hollywood area of Los Angeles.

Memoir
While promoting her memoir, Love and Consequences, in radio interviews with WBUR's On Point and NPR's Tell Me More, Seltzer spoke with an African American Vernacular dialect and frequently referred to alleged gang friends as "homies" and "my home girl".

The book's publisher, Riverhead Books, recalled all copies of the book and audiobook from booksellers. Amazon.com and Barnes & Noble pulled the purchase page for the book from both of their sites, and Riverhead offered refunds to those who purchased it. The hoax was discovered when the publisher was contacted by Seltzer's sister. Speaking to the New York Times, Seltzer later admitted that the personal details of her memoir were fabricated, but claimed that some details were based on the real experiences of friends.

See also

Misery lit
Rachel Dolezal
James Frey
Rose Christo
Pretendian

References

External links 
 

1975 births
Impostors
Living people
Literary forgeries
Writers from Eugene, Oregon
Writers from California